Franz Anton Beckenbauer (born 11 September 1945) is a German former professional  footballer and manager. In his playing career he was nicknamed Der Kaiser ("The Emperor") because of his elegant style, dominance and leadership on the field, and also as his first name "Franz" is reminiscent of the Austrian emperors. He is widely regarded to be one of the greatest players in the history of the sport. A versatile player who started out as a midfielder, Beckenbauer made his name as a central defender. He is often credited as having invented the role of the modern sweeper (libero). With success at club and international level, he is one of nine players to have won the FIFA World Cup, the UEFA Champions League and the Ballon d'Or.

Twice named European Footballer of the Year, Beckenbauer appeared 103 times for West Germany and played in three FIFA World Cups and two European Championships. He is one of three men, along with Brazil's Mário Zagallo and France's Didier Deschamps, to have won the World Cup as a player and as a manager; he lifted the World Cup trophy as captain in 1974, and repeated the feat as a manager in 1990. He was the first captain to lift the World Cup and European Championship at international level and the European Cup at club level. He was named in the World Team of the 20th Century in 1998, the FIFA World Cup Dream Team in 2002, the Ballon d'Or Dream Team in 2020, and in 2004 was listed in the FIFA 100 of the world's greatest living players.

At club level with Bayern Munich, Beckenbauer won the European Cup Winners' Cup in 1967 and three consecutive European Cups from 1974 to 1976. The latter feat made him the first player to win three European Cups as captain of his club. He became team manager and later president of Bayern Munich. After two spells with the New York Cosmos he was inducted into the U.S. National Soccer Hall of Fame.

Beckenbauer led Germany's successful bid to host the 2006 FIFA World Cup and chaired the organizing committee. He worked as a pundit for Sky Germany, and for 34 years as a columnist for the tabloid Bild, both until 2016. In August 2016, it was announced Beckenbauer was being investigated for fraud and money laundering as part of the 2006 World Cup.  The investigation was closed without a verdict in 2020 as the statute of limitations expired.

Early years
Franz Beckenbauer was born in the post-war ruins of Munich, the second son of postal-worker Franz Beckenbauer, Sr. and his wife Antonie (née Hupfauf). He grew up in the working-class district of Giesing and, despite his father's cynicism about the game, started playing football at the age of nine with the youth team of SC Munich '06 in 1954.

Originally a centre forward, he idolised 1954 FIFA World Cup winner Fritz Walter and supported local side 1860 Munich, then the pre-eminent team in the city, despite their relegation from the top league, the Oberliga Süd, in the 1950s. "It was always my dream to play for them" he would later confirm. That he joined the Bayern Munich youth team in 1959, rather than that of his favourites 1860 Munich, was the result of a contentious Under-14 youth tournament in nearby Neubiberg. Beckenbauer and his teammates were aware that their SC Munich '06 club lacked the finance to continue running its youth sides, and had determined to join 1860 Munich as a group upon the tournament's conclusion. However, fortune decreed that SC Munich and 1860 would meet in the final and a series of niggles during the match eventually resulted in a physical confrontation between Beckenbauer and the opposing centre-half. The ill-feeling this engendered had a strong effect upon Beckenbauer and his teammates, who decided to join Bayern's youth side rather than the team they had recently come to blows with.

In 1963, at the age of 18, Beckenbauer was engulfed by controversy when it was revealed that his then girlfriend was pregnant and that he had no intention of marrying her; he was banned from the West Germany national youth team by the DFB and only readmitted after the intervention of the side's coach Dettmar Cramer.

Club career

Beckenbauer made his debut with Bayern in a Bundesliga promotion play-off match on the left wing against FC St. Pauli on 6 June 1964. In his first season in the Regionalliga Süd ("Regional League South", then the second level in Germany), 1964–65, the team won the league and eventually promoted to the Bundesliga.

Bayern soon became a force in the new German league, winning the German Cup in 1966–67 and achieving European success in the Cup Winners' Cup in 1967. Beckenbauer became team captain for the 1968–69 season and led his club to their first league title. He began experimenting with the sweeper (libero) role around this time, refining the role into a new form and becoming perhaps the greatest exponent of the attacking sweeper game.

During Beckenbauer's tenure at Bayern Munich, the club won three league championships in a row from 1972 to 1974 and also a hat-trick of European Cup wins (1974–76) which earned the club the honour of keeping the trophy permanently.

Since 1968 Beckenbauer, has been called Der Kaiser by fans and the media. The following anecdote is told (even by Beckenbauer himself) to explain the origin: On the occasion of a friendly game of Bayern Munich in Vienna, Austria, Beckenbauer posed for a photo session right beside a bust of the former Austrian emperor Franz Joseph I. The media called him Fußball-Kaiser (football-emperor) afterwards, soon after he was just called Der Kaiser. However, according to a report in the German newspaper Welt am Sonntag, this explanation is untrue, though very popular. According to the report, Beckenbauer fouled his opposite number, Reinhard Libuda from Schalke 04, in the cup final on 14 June 1969. Disregarding the fans' hooting, Beckenbauer took the ball into the opposite part of the field, where he balanced the ball in front of the upset fans for half a minute. Libuda was commonly called König von Westfalen (king of Westphalia), so the press looked for an even more exalted moniker and invented Der Kaiser.

In 1977, Beckenbauer accepted a lucrative contract to play in the North American Soccer League with the New York Cosmos. He played with the Cosmos for four seasons up to 1980, and the team won the Soccer Bowl on three occasions (1977, 1978, 1980).

Beckenbauer retired after a two-year spell with Hamburger SV in Germany (1980–82) with the win of the Bundesliga title that year and one final season with the New York Cosmos in 1983. In his career, he appeared in 754 competitive club matches.

International career
Beckenbauer won 103 caps and scored 14 goals for West Germany. He was a member of the World Cup squads that finished runners-up in 1966, third place in 1970, and champions in 1974, while also being named to the tournament all-star team in all three editions. He also won the 1972 European Football Championship and finished as runners-up in the 1976 edition. Beckenbauer's first game for the national team came on 26 September 1965.

1966 World Cup

Beckenbauer appeared in his first World Cup in 1966, playing every match. In his first World Cup match, against Switzerland, he scored twice in a 5–0 win. West Germany won their group, and then beat Uruguay 4–0 in quarter-finals, with Beckenbauer scoring the second goal in the 70th minute.

In the semi-finals, the Germans faced the USSR. Helmut Haller opened the scoring, with Beckenbauer contributing the second of the match, his fourth goal of the tournament. The Soviets scored a late goal but were unable to draw level, and West Germany advanced to the final against hosts England. The English won the final and the Jules Rimet Trophy in extra time. The Germans had fallen at the final hurdle, but Beckenbauer had a notable tournament, finishing tied for third on the list of top scorers—from a non-attacking position. The team returned to a heroes' welcome in their homeland.

1970 World Cup
West Germany won their first three matches before facing England in the second round in a rematch of the 1966 final. The English were ahead 2–0 in the second half, but a spectacular goal by Beckenbauer in the 69th minute helped the Germans recover and equalise before the end of normal time and win the match in extra time. West Germany advanced to the semi-finals to face Italy, in what would be known as the Game of the Century. He dislocated his shoulder after being fouled, but he was not deterred from continuing in the match, as his side had already used their two permitted substitutions. He stayed on the field carrying his dislocated arm in a sling. The result of this match was 4–3 (after extra time) in favour of the Italians. Germany defeated Uruguay 1–0 for third place.

1972 European championship
Beckenbauer became captain of the national side in 1971. In 1972, West Germany won the European Championship, beating the Soviet Union 3–0 in the final.

1974 World Cup
The 1974 World Cup was hosted by West Germany and Beckenbauer led his side to victory, including a hard-fought 2–1 win over the hotly favoured Netherlands side featuring Johan Cruyff. Beckenbauer and fellow defenders man-marked Cruyff so well that the Dutch were never quite able to put their "Total Football" into full use.

Beckenbauer became the first captain to lift the new FIFA World Cup Trophy after Brazil had retained the Jules Rimet Trophy in 1970. This also gave West Germany the distinction of being the first European national team to hold both the European Championship and World Cup titles simultaneously (two other countries have done it since: France in 2000, and Spain in 2010).

1976 European Championship
In the 1976 competition, West Germany again reached the final, where they lost on penalties to Czechoslovakia. Beckenbauer was named in the Team of the Tournament.

Beckenbauer retired from international football in 1977, at the age of 31, following his move to New York Cosmos.

Managerial career

On his return to Germany, Beckenbauer was appointed manager of the West Germany national team to replace Jupp Derwall on 12 September 1984. He took the team all the way to the final of the 1986 World Cup, where they lost to the Diego Maradona inspired Argentina.

In 1990, before the German reunification, Beckenbauer managed the last Germany national football team without East German players in a World Cup, winning the final 1–0, against Argentina, in a rematch of the previous World Cup final. Beckenbauer is one of three men (with Mario Zagallo, and Didier Deschamps) to have won the Cup as player and as manager, and he is the first man and one of only two (with Didier Deschamps) to have won the title as team captain as well as manager.

Beckenbauer then moved into club management, and accepted a job with Olympique de Marseille in 1990 but left the club within one year. Marseille eventually won the 1990–91 French championship and ended runner-up of the 1990–91 European Cup.

From 28 December 1993 until 30 June 1994, and then from 29 April 1996 until 30 June of the same year, he managed Bayern Munich. His brief spells in charge saw him collect two further honours – the Bundesliga title in 1994 and the UEFA Cup in 1996.

In 1994, he took on the role of club president at Bayern, and much of the success in the following years has been credited to his astute management. Following the club's decision to change from an association to a limited company, he has been chairman of the advisory board since the beginning of 2002. He stepped down as president of Bayern in 2009, being succeeded by long-time general manager Uli Hoeneß.

In 1998, he became vice-president of the German Football Association. At the end of the 1990s, Beckenbauer headed the successful bid by Germany to organize the 2006 FIFA World Cup. He chaired the organizational committee for the World Cup and was a commentator for the Bild-Zeitung.

FIFA inquiries and ban

In June 2014, Beckenbauer was banned by FIFA Ethics Committee for 90 days from any football-related activity for allegedly refusing to cooperate with an inquiry into corruption dealing with the allocation of the 2018 and 2022 World Cups to Russia and Qatar. He protested the ban, as he had requested the questions that were put to him be in German and in writing. The ban was lifted after Beckenbauer agreed to participate in FIFA's inquiry. In February 2016, Beckenbauer was fined CHF 7,000 and warned by FIFA Ethics Committee for failing to cooperate with the inquiry in 2014.

In March 2016, the Ethics Committee opened formal proceedings against Beckenbauer regarding the awarding of the 2006 FIFA World Cup to Germany.

In October 2019, Black Mirror Leaks published email correspondence of Russian member of Parliament, Sergey Kapkov, where Beckenbauer and his adviser, Fedor Radmann, were named as recipients of €3 million for their votes in favour of Russia as host of the 2018 World Cup. Both allegedly received an additional €1.5 million in success fees after the 2018 cup was allocated to Russia.

In 2021, FIFA closed its ethics inquiry against Beckenbauer as the statute of limitations expired.

Legacy

Beckenbauer is widely considered to be one of the greatest footballers in the history of the game. He is the only defender in football history to win the Ballon d'Or twice.  He is often credited as having invented the role of the modern sweeper or libero, a defensive player who  intervenes proactively in the offensive game of his team. Named European Footballer of the Year twice, Beckenbauer was chosen on the World Team of the 20th Century in 1998, and the FIFA World Cup Dream Team in 2002.

An icon in Germany, and one of only three men to have won the World Cup both as a player and as a manager, Beckenbauer was lauded by former German chancellor Gerhard Schröder for winning the World Cup as a player in 1974, winning as manager in 1990, and for playing a leading role in Germany's success of achieving host status of the 2006 World Cup.

Media
During his playing career, Beckenbauer's popularity was such that he was included as a character in Monty Python's sketch "The Philosophers' Football Match" as the sole genuine player and a "surprise inclusion" to the German team. During the match, between famous Greek and German philosophers, instead of actually playing football, the "players" walk in circles contemplating philosophy, while "asking questions", a popular phrase used by English football commentators, much to the confusion of Beckenbauer.

In a 2013 advertisement for South Korean company Samsung, Beckenbauer appeared as the manager of a Galaxy XI of football players from around the globe, and hands the captain's armband to Lionel Messi. Beckenbauer features in EA Sports' FIFA video game series; he was included in the FIFA 15 Ultimate Team Legends.

Personal life

Beckenbauer has been married three times and has five children, one of whom, Stephan, was a professional footballer, who died after a long illness on 31 July 2015, at the age of 46. Stephan's son Luca is also a professional footballer, currently playing for SV Wacker Burghausen in the Regionalliga Bayern. After appearing in an advertisement for a big mobile phone company, Beckenbauer specifically requested the number 0176 / 666666 for his mobile phone. However, he soon was flooded with phone calls by men who thought it was a phone sex number (in German, "6" translates to "sechs", sounding similar to the word sex).

In 2016 and 2017, Beckenbauer had cardiac surgery twice. He also had an artificial hip inserted in 2018.

Career statistics

Club

International

Scores and results list Germany's goal tally first, score column indicates score after each Beckenbauer goal.

Managing statistics

Honours

Player
Bayern Munich
Regionalliga Süd: 1964–65
Bundesliga: 1968–69, 1971–72, 1972–73, 1973–74
DFB-Pokal: 1965–66, 1966–67, 1968–69, 1970–71
European Cup: 1973–74, 1974–75, 1975–76
European Cup Winners' Cup: 1966–67
Intercontinental Cup: 1976

Hamburger SV
Bundesliga: 1981–82

New York Cosmos
North American Soccer League: 1977, 1978, 1980

West Germany
FIFA World Cup: 1974
UEFA European Championship: 1972

Manager
West Germany
FIFA World Cup: 1990

Marseille
Ligue 1: 1990–91

Bayern Munich
Bundesliga: 1993–94
UEFA Cup: 1995–96

Individual
Player
Ballon d'Or: 1972, 1976; runner-up: 1974, 1975; third place: 1966
Footballer of the Year (Germany): 1966, 1968, 1974, 1976
kicker Bundesliga Team of the Season: 1965–66, 1966–67, 1967–68, 1968–69, 1969–70, 1970–71, 1971–72, 1972–73, 1973–74, 1974–75, 1975–76, 1976–77
FIFA World Cup Best Young Player Award: 1966
FIFA World Cup Bronze Boot: 1966
FIFA World Cup All-Star Team: 1966, 1970, 1974
FIFA XI: 1968
FIFA World Cup Silver Ball: 1974
NASL Most Valuable Player Award: 1977
FIFA Order of Merit: 1984
FIFA World Cup All-Time Team: 1994
UEFA Euro Team of the Tournament: 1972, 1976
World Team of the 20th Century: 1998
FIFA World Cup Dream Team: 2002
FIFA Centennial Player and Football Personality Award: 2004
FIFA 100: 2004
Laureus Lifetime Achievement Award: 2007
IFFHS Universal Genius of World Football: 2007
Golden Foot: 2010, as football legend
Marca Leyenda: 2012
FIFA Presidential Award: 2012
UEFA President's Award: 2012
World Soccer Greatest XI of all time: 2013
UEFA Euro All-time XI: 2016
UEFA Golden Jubilee Poll (2004): second place
World Soccer (magazine) The greatest players of 20th century: fourth place
IFFHS Best European Player 1956–1990
IFFHS World Player of the Century: third place 
IFFHS European Player of the Century: second place
IFFHS Legends
Bayern Munich All-time XI
Member of Germany's Sports Hall of Fame
 Ballon d'Or Dream Team: 2020
 IFFHS All-time Men's Dream Team: 2021

Manager
European Coach of the Year—Sepp Herberger Award: 1990
World Soccer Awards Manager of the Year: 1990
World Soccer 29th Greatest Manager of All Time: 2013

Civil
 Cross of the Order of Merit of the Federal Republic of Germany: 1976
 Bavarian Order of Merit: 1982
 Cross of Merit 1st Class of the Federal Republic of Germany: 1986
Honorary Golden Coin of the City of Munich: 1995
Honorary Doctor of the National Sports Academy: 2004
 Commanders' Cross of Merit of the Federal Republic of Germany: 2006
 Lower Saxon Merit 1st Class: 2008
 Order of Merit of the State of North Rhine-Westphalia: 2009
Honorary consul of the Republic of Kosovo: 2011

See also
 List of men's footballers with 100 or more international caps
 List of UEFA Cup winning managers

References

Bibliography

Literature 
 Beckenbauer, Franz, Cramer, Dettmar: Nicht nur ein Spiel!. Rowohlt, Reinbek 2006, .
 Körner, Torsten: Franz Beckenbauer – der freie Mann. Scherz, Frankfurt 2005, .
 Kratzert, Armin: Beckenbauer taucht nicht auf. Roman. Kirchheim Verlag, München 2012, 
 Kummermehr, Petra (Hrsg.): Das Buch Franz. Botschaften eines Kaisers. Diederichs, München 2011, .

External links

 Franz Beckenbauer Foundation 
 Facts on Beckenbauer 
 
 Portrait of Franz Beckenbauer

!colspan="3" style="background:#C1D8FF;"| World Cup-winners status
|-
|  style="width:32%; text-align:center;"| Previous:Mário Zagallo
|  style="width:36%; text-align:center;"| Player and Manager1974, '90
|  style="width:32%; text-align:center;"| Next:Didier Deschamps

1945 births
Living people
1966 FIFA World Cup players
1970 FIFA World Cup players
1974 FIFA World Cup players
1986 FIFA World Cup managers
1990 FIFA World Cup managers
FC Bayern Munich board members
FC Bayern Munich managers
FC Bayern Munich footballers
Ballon d'Or winners
FIFA 100
FIFA Century Club
FIFA World Cup-winning captains
FIFA World Cup-winning managers
FIFA World Cup-winning players
Bundesliga players
Association football sweepers
German expatriate footballers
Expatriate soccer players in the United States
German expatriate sportspeople in France
German football chairmen and investors
German football managers
West German football managers
German footballers
Germany international footballers
Germany B international footballers
Germany youth international footballers
Germany national football team managers
Hamburger SV players
Laureus World Sports Awards winners
National Soccer Hall of Fame members
New York Cosmos players
North American Soccer League (1968–1984) players
Olympique de Marseille managers
German expatriate football managers
Expatriate football managers in France
Commanders Crosses of the Order of Merit of the Federal Republic of Germany
Members of the Order of Merit of North Rhine-Westphalia
UEFA Cup winning managers
UEFA Euro 1972 players
UEFA Euro 1976 players
UEFA Euro 1988 managers
UEFA European Championship-winning captains
UEFA European Championship-winning players
West German expatriate footballers
West German expatriate sportspeople in the United States
West German footballers
Bundesliga managers
Recipients of the Silver Laurel Leaf
Footballers from Munich
UEFA Champions League winning players